Chakkalathi is a 1979 Indian Tamil-language film starring directed by Devaraj–Mohan and written Alagapuri Alagappan. The film stars Sudhakar, Shoba, Ambika and Vijayan. It was the debut of Ambika, who later became one of Tamil cinema's biggest stars in the 1980s. The film was released on 7 December 1979.

Plot

Cast 
 Sudhakar as Samikannu
 Shoba as Panchali
 Ambika as Azhagammai
 Vijayan as Veerappan
 Y. Vijaya
 Karuppu Subbiah
 Thideer Kannaiah
 Vijayachandrika
 Thayir Vadai Desikan

Guest appearances
 Sarath Babu
 Saritha

Soundtrack 
The music was composed by Ilaiyaraaja. The song "Enna Paattu" is set to Mayamalavagowla raga.

Reception 
Kousigan of Kalki appreciated Prasath's cinematography and Ilaiyaraaja's music, but criticised Devaraj–Mohan's direction.

References

External links 
 

1970s Tamil-language films
1979 drama films
1979 films
Films directed by Devaraj–Mohan
Films scored by Ilaiyaraaja
Indian drama films